The following is a list of notable events and releases of the year 1953 in Norwegian music.

Events

June
 1 – The 1st Bergen International Festival started in Bergen, Norway (June 1 – 15).

Unknown date
 The Hot Saints Jazzband was established (1953–60).
 The Big Chief Jazz Club was established at Majorstuhuset in Oslo.

Deaths

 December
 9 – Issay Dobrowen, pianist, composer and conductor (born 1891).

Births

 January
 6 – Jon Eberson, jazz guitarist.

 February
 18 – Erling Aksdal, jazz pianist.

 April
 13 – Tom Olstad, jazz drummer.
 25 – Per Kolstad, pianist and keyboardist, Lava.

 May
 12 – Odd Riisnæs, jazz saxophonist.

 June
 2 – Vidar Johansen, jazz saxophonist.
 10 – Svein Nymo, violinist and composer (died 2014).
 30 – Ståle Wikshåland musicologist (died 2017).

 July
 10 – Lasse Myrvold, musician and composer, The Aller Værste! (died 2006).
 13 – Sigurd Ulveseth, jazz upright bassist and orchestra leader.

 September
 8 – Stein-Erik Olsen, classical guitarist and professor of guitar at the University of Bergen.

 November
 2 – Stein Erik Tafjord, jazz tubist.
 7 – Erik Balke, jazz saxophonist.

 Unknown date
 Geir Johnson, composer, writer and initiator of culture projects.
 Per Hannevold, bassoonist, Bergen Philharmonic Orchestra and Bergen Woodwind Quintet.

See also
 1953 in Norway
 Music of Norway

References

 
Norwegian music
Norwegian
Music
1950s in Norwegian music